Pristimantis molybrignus is a species of frog in the family Strabomantidae.
It is endemic to Colombia.
Its natural habitats are tropical moist montane forests, rivers, and heavily degraded former forest.

References

molybrignus
Amphibians of Colombia
Endemic fauna of Colombia
Amphibians described in 1986
Taxonomy articles created by Polbot